The 2022 Rally Liepaja (also known as Tet Rally Liepaja 2022) will be the 10th edition of Rally Liepāja and will take place between July 1 and 3, 2022. The event is the fifth round of the 2022 European Rally Championship. The event will be based in Talsi and is set to be contested over 12 stages.

Background
The event will be opened to crews competing in European Rally Championship with its support categories and any private crews. Overall of 50 crews entered the event, with 45 crews entering ERC.

Entry list

References

2022 in Latvian sport
Rally Liepāja
2022 European Rally Championship season